José Maria Fidélis dos Santos (13 March 1944 – 28 November 2012), known as just Fidélis, was a Brazilian football player and coach, who played as a defender.

Santos was born in São José dos Campos (SP). He played for the following clubs: Bangu, Vasco, América-RJ, Corinthians, ABC, Operário-MS and São José-SP. He earned 8 caps (1 non-official) for the Brazil national team, and was part of the team at the 1966 FIFA World Cup.

On 28 November 2012, he died in his hometown São José do Campos from stomach cancer.

References

1944 births
2012 deaths
People from São José dos Campos
Brazilian footballers
Association football defenders
Brazilian football managers
1966 FIFA World Cup players
Campeonato Brasileiro Série A players
United Soccer Association players
Brazil international footballers
Bangu Atlético Clube players
CR Vasco da Gama players
America Football Club (RJ) players
ABC Futebol Clube players
Operário Futebol Clube (MS) players
São José Esporte Clube players
Guarani Esporte Clube (MG) managers
Footballers from São Paulo (state)